KWPT is a commercial classic rock/hits music radio station licensed to Fortuna, California, broadcasting to the Eureka, California area on 100.3 FM.  It is owned by KWPT, Inc. KWPT also serves Eureka, California, on translator K275BI at 102.9 FM.

History
KWPT carried a Rhythmic Top 40 format previous to the current classic rock/hits format and was known as The Party. Before that it aired a Smooth Jazz format. All formats on KWPT have been locally executed, which is unique for the Eureka, CA metro market.

Personalities
KWPT The Point's airstaff includes: Ben in the morning and Chuck Rogers afternoons. Previous DJs include Carole Ann, Janet Carney, and Andy Powell.  The programming is generated entirely from the Ferndale, California studios.

External links
Official Website

WPT
Classic rock radio stations in the United States
Mass media in Humboldt County, California
Radio stations established in 1992
1992 establishments in California